The Pittsworth Sentinel is a weekly newspaper from Pittsworth, Queensland, Australia. It is published and released every Wednesday.

Digitisation 
The paper has been digitised as part of the Australian Newspapers Digitisation Program  of the National Library of Australia.

References

External links
 

Newspapers published in Queensland
Toowoomba Region
Newspapers on Trove
Weekly newspapers published in Australia